Act I is the first live album released by the Finnish soprano Tarja Turunen. The two concerts were recorded and filmed with 10 HD cameras at the El Círculo Theatre in Rosario, Argentina, in March 2012, and released on CD, DVD and Blu-ray on the 24th of August, 2012. Additionally, the Act I media book contains a live recording from Luna Park (titled DVD3).

The track listing consists in a mix of her three solo albums, Nightwish's classic "Nemo" and covers of Andrew Lloyd Webber, Gary Moore and Whitesnake plus a variety of extras.

On the 10th of July 2012 earMUSIC released the first official teaser for "Act I".

Reception

The recording was well received among critics. A review from the website getredytoROCK! stated that "this live CD will certainly please her fans, [...] epic metal meets pop and classical never sounded so good."

In its review for Firebrand Magazine, Lee Walker commented that "Tarja has once again proved that she walks alone, 7 long years have passed since she parted ways with her previous band, and throughout that time she has continued to prove that she is a successful artist in her right. “Act I” manages to successfully capture all of the magic behind her live performances."

Ant May from Planetmosh praised the technical aspects of the DVD, stating that "The lighting is fantastic with plenty of colour and lighting effects plus use of lasers which all combine to create great visuals." and also called the sound "flawless" and "crystal clear"

Double DVD track listing

+ Bonus:
Interviews with Tarja & the band members
Videoclip: "Into the Sun"
Photogallery 1: Through the Eyes of the Fans
Photogallery 2: From Our Vaults: A Fly on the Wall

Double CD track listing

Media Book
An alternative edition of Act I contains the double CD and DVDs, as well an 80-page photo book and an additional live DVD of the concert at Luna Park.

Personnel

Charts

References

External links
 Act I website
 Tarja official Facebook page
 Tarja Turunen Official website
 Act I : Live in Rosario official teaser

2012 live albums
2012 video albums
Tarja Turunen albums
Edel AG albums
Live video albums